The Zaporizhzhia City Council is a local government area that governs Zaporizhzhia, a city of regional significance located in southeast Ukraine. Its population was 810,620 in the 2001 Ukrainian Census.

Government
The Zaporizhzhia City Council (and the city of Zaporizhzhia itself), is governed by a mayor, who is elected every four years in local Ukrainian elections. The last election took place in 2015, and saw the election of independent candidate Volodymyr Buriak as mayor.

The municipality's legislative branch is the city council, which consists of 90 locally-elected deputies.

Administrative divisions
The Zaporizhzhia City Council contains a total of seven administrative raions (districts):
Zavodskyi District
Khortytskyi District
Komunarskyi District
Dniprovskyi District
Oleksandrivskyi District
Voznesenskyi District
Shevchenkivskyi District

The former urban-type settlement of Teplychne was previously a settlement council and an administrative unit of the Shevchenko Raion, although it was annexed to Zaporizhzhia's city limits based on a resolution of the Zaporizhzhia Oblast Council dated 23 April 2009.

References

External links
 
 

Buildings and structures in Zaporizhzhia
City and town halls in Ukraine